William Salisbury (23 February 1899 – 5 January 1965) was a Scottish footballer who played as an outside left for Partick Thistle (where he spent a decade, winning the Scottish Cup in 1921), in England with Liverpool (where he played for a season) and spells with Bangor and Distillery in Northern Ireland plus Shelbourne in the Republic of Ireland.

His grandson Gordon Smith was also a footballer (he played for St Johnstone, Aston Villa, Tottenham Hotspur, Wolverhampton Wanderers).

References

External links
 LFC History profile

1899 births
Scottish footballers
Liverpool F.C. players
1965 deaths
People from Govan
Footballers from Glasgow
St Anthony's F.C. players
Partick Thistle F.C. players
Bangor F.C. players
Lisburn Distillery F.C. players
Scottish Junior Football Association players
Scottish Football League players
English Football League players
NIFL Premiership players
League of Ireland players
Shelbourne F.C. players
Association football outside forwards
Scottish expatriate sportspeople in Ireland
Scottish expatriate footballers
Expatriate association footballers in the Republic of Ireland